Nonochton is the Classical Nahuatl name for a plant whose identity is uncertain. Suggested plants include Portulaca, Pereskiopsis, and Lycianthes mociniana, a plant now called tlanochtle in the local variety of modern Nahuatl spoken by highland farmers that cultivate it for its fruit.

Medicinal uses
In Aztec medicine, nonochton was used as an ingredient in a remedy for pain at the heart:

See also
Aztec entheogenic complex

References

Medicinal plants
Aztec science and technology
Nahuatl words and phrases